Paludicola may refer to:

8977 Paludicola, a minor planet
Paludicola (alga), a genus of algae in the order Batrachospermales
Paludicola (bacterium), a genus of bacteria in the family Oscillospiraceae
Paludicola (journal)